Dhudial railway station is  located in Dhudial, Punjab, Pakistan.

See also
 List of railway stations in Pakistan
 Pakistan Railways

References

External links

Railway stations in Chakwal District
Railway stations on Mandra–Bhaun Railway Line